Kathleen Genevieve Ledecky (born March 17, 1997) is an American competitive swimmer. She has won seven Olympic gold medals and 19 world championship gold medals, the most in history for a female swimmer. Ledecky's six individual gold medals at the Olympics, 14 individual gold medals at the World Aquatics Championships, and 22 overall medals at the World Aquatics Championships are records in women's swimming‌. Ledecky is the world record holder in the women's  800- and 1500-meter freestyle (both long course and short course) as well as the former world record holder in the women's 400-meter freestyle (long course). She also holds the fastest-ever times in the women's 500-, 1000-, and 1650-yard freestyle events. She is widely regarded as one of the greatest Olympians and the greatest female swimmer of all time.

In her international debut at the 2012 London Olympic Games as a 15-year-old, Ledecky unexpectedly won the gold medal in the women's 800-metre freestyle. Four years later, she left Rio de Janeiro as the most decorated female athlete of the 2016 Olympic Games, with four gold medals, one silver medal, and two world records. At the 2020 Olympic Games, Ledecky also emerged as the most decorated U.S. female athlete and became the first American female swimmer to win an individual event in three straight Olympiads. In total, she has won 42 medals (34 golds, 7 silvers, and 1 bronze) in major international competitions, spanning the Summer Olympics, World Championships, and Pan Pacific Championships. During her career, she has broken sixteen world records.

Ledecky's success has earned her Swimming World Female World Swimmer of the Year a record-breaking five times. Ledecky was also named Associated Press Female Athlete of the Year in 2017 and 2022, international female Champion of Champions by L'Équipe in 2014 and 2017, United States Olympic Committee Female Athlete of the Year in 2013, 2016 and 2017, Sportswoman of the Year by the Women's Sports Foundation in 2017, and the ESPY Best Female Athlete in 2022.

Early life, swimming, and education

Ledecky was born in Washington, D.C. and raised in the suburb of Bethesda, Maryland, the daughter of Mary Gen (Hagan) and David Ledecky. Her Czech-born paternal grandfather Jaromír Ledecky arrived in New York City on September 8, 1947, as a student, later becoming an economist, and married an Ashkenazi Jewish woman named Berta Ruth Greenwald (Ledecky's paternal grandmother) in Brooklyn on December 30, 1956, and through her Ledecky has relatives who were killed in the Holocaust in Europe. Ledecky's mother is of Irish descent. She was raised Catholic. Her uncle Jon Ledecky is a businessman and a co-owner of the NHL team New York Islanders.

Ledecky began swimming at the age of six due to the influence of her older brother, Michael, and her mother, who swam for the University of New Mexico. In Bethesda, she attended Little Flower School through eighth grade and graduated from Stone Ridge School of the Sacred Heart in 2015. During her high-school swimming career, Ledecky twice set the American and US Open record in the 500-yard freestyle, and she twice set the national high-school record in the 200-yard freestyle. Ledecky finished her high-school career as the holder of the Stone Ridge school record in every swimming event except the 100-meter breaststroke.

During the summer of 2012, she trained with the Nation's Capital Swim Club (formerly the Curl Burke Swim Club) under coach Yuri Suguiyama. Following Suguiyama's departure to coach for the University of California, Berkeley, she continued to train with the Nation's Capital Swim Club under coach Bruce Gemmell through the 2016 Olympics. During the summers prior to 2012, she swam for Palisades Swim Team in Cabin John, Maryland. Ledecky accepted an athletic scholarship to Stanford University, where she swam for coach Greg Meehan's Stanford Cardinal women's swimming team.

In December 2016, Ledecky was chosen as one of the sponsors of the US Navy aircraft carrier  alongside gymnast Simone Biles. They are the first Olympians to be given this honor.

In December 2020, she completed the required courses for a bachelor of arts in psychology and minor in political science from Stanford University,  and graduated in June 2021.

Swimming career

2012

US Olympic Trials
At the 2012 United States Olympic Trials in Omaha, Nebraska (her first senior national competition), Ledecky made the Olympic team by placing first in the 800-meter freestyle with a time of 8:19.78, which was over two seconds ahead of second-place finisher Kate Ziegler. In Omaha, Ledecky also placed third in the 400-meter freestyle (4:05.00) and ninth in the 200-meter freestyle (1:58.66). Her third-place finish in the 400-meter freestyle was the fastest time ever swum by a 15- to 16-year-old American. At 15 years, 4 months, and 10 days, she was the youngest American participant at the 2012 Olympic Games.

Summer Olympic Games

At the 2012 Summer Olympics in London, Ledecky qualified to swim in the final of the 800-meter freestyle by placing third overall in the heats with a time of 8:23.84. In the final, Ledecky stunned the field, winning gold by more than four seconds, with a time of 8:14.63, the then second-fastest effort of all time just behind Rebecca Adlington's world record of 8:14.10 set in 2008. In addition, she broke Janet Evans' American record of 8:16.22 that had stood since 1989. In the final, Ledecky went out hard and, by the 200-meter mark, she had already established an almost body-length lead. Her 400-meter split was 4:04.34, a personal best for Ledecky in that distance, and would have placed fifth in the individual 400-meter freestyle. At the 750-meter mark, Ledecky was 3.42 seconds ahead of Mireia Belmonte García, and 0.31 seconds under world record pace. Ledecky won by 4.13 seconds and just missed the world record by 0.53 seconds. Her gold was the first international medal of her career, earning her the 2012 Best Female Performance of the Year and Breakout Performer of the Year at the Golden Goggle Awards.

2013
At the 2013 US National Championships, Ledecky qualified to swim in four individual events and the 4×200-meter freestyle relay at the 2013 World Aquatics Championships in Barcelona, Spain, though she later dropped the 200-meter freestyle from her program. At the National Championships, she finished first in the 400-, 800- and 1500-meter freestyle, and second in the 200-meter freestyle.

World Championships

At the 2013 World Championships, Ledecky won gold in the 400-, 800-, and 1500-meter freestyle, and in the 4×200-meter freestyle relay, and set two world records. In winning the 400 through 1500-meter titles, she became the second woman ever to win the events in a World Championships since German Hannah Stockbauer in 2003. In her first event in Barcelona, the 400-meter freestyle, Ledecky became a world champion for the first time by winning in 3:59.82, setting a new American record and becoming the second-fastest performer of all time in the event.

In her second event, Ledecky won gold in the 1500-meter freestyle in a world record time of 15:36.53, breaking the record held by compatriot Kate Ziegler by six seconds. The hard-fought race saw Ledecky overcome Dane Lotte Friis in the final few hundred meters after losing the lead at the 300-meter mark and included a final 50 split of 29.47.

In her third, and first relay event of her international career, the 4×200-meter freestyle, Ledecky and teammates Shannon Vreeland, Karlee Bispo, and Missy Franklin won gold in 7:45.14. Anchor Missy Franklin overtook Australian Alicia Coutts in the last 200 meters, giving the US the gold. Ledecky provided the US with an early lead, swimming the first leg in a personal best of 1:56.32.

In her fourth and last event, the 800-meter freestyle, Ledecky won gold in a world record of 8:13.86, bettering Rebecca Adlington's world record of 8:14.10. Much like the 1500-meter freestyle, Ledecky let Lotte Friis lead most of the race, making a move at the 650-meter mark to eventually win the race by 2.46 seconds.

Ledecky scored more points than any other swimmer to earn the FINA trophy for best female swimmer of the meet.

At year's end, Ledecky was named the World Swimmer of the Year and American Swimmer of the Year by Swimming World magazine. She was also named the best female swimmer for 2013 by FINA Aquatics World magazine.

2014
Ledecky began the year by breaking her own world records in the 800- and 1500-meter freestyle at the 2014 Woodlands Swim Team Senior Invitational in June. Despite being in season and swimming multiple events, Ledecky was able to first break the world record in the 1500-meter freestyle with a time of 15:34.23, bettering her previous mark of 15:36.53. Three days later, Ledecky then broke the world record in the 800-meter freestyle with a time of 8:11.00, bettering her previous mark of 8:13.86.

At the 2014 US National Championships, the qualifying meet for both the 2014 Pan Pacific Swimming Championships and the 2015 World Aquatics Championships, Ledecky finished first in the 200-, 400-, and 800-meter freestyle. In the 400-meter freestyle, Ledecky set her third world record of the year by breaking Federica Pellegrini's 2009 world record of 3:59.15 with a time of 3:58.86. With her mark in the 400, Ledecky became the first female since Janet Evans to hold world records simultaneously in the 400-, 800-, and 1500-meter freestyles.

Pan Pacific Championships

At the 2014 Pan Pacific Swimming Championships in Gold Coast, Australia, Ledecky won five gold medals and broke two world records. Her wins came in the 200-, 400-, 800-, and 1500-meter freestyle and the 4×200-meter freestyle. Ledecky almost broke the world record in the 800-meter freestyle, finishing with a time of 8:11.35. Her world records came in the 400- and 1500-meter freestyles, with times of 3:58.37 and 15:28.36, respectively. She became the first woman to win four individual gold medals at a single Pan Pacific Championship.

In the 200-meter freestyle final, Ledecky had over a half-second lead on the field at the halfway point before winning by 1.46 seconds with a meet record time of 1:55.74. Less than an hour later, Ledecky won the 800-meter freestyle, swimming under her world record pace for most of the race before touching in at 8:11.35, the second-fastest time ever, to win by 7.52 seconds over New Zealand swimmer Lauren Boyle.

The next day, Ledecky added her third meet record by swimming on the American 4×200-meter freestyle relay team with Shannon Vreeland, Missy Franklin, and Leah Smith. Swimming the anchor leg, Ledecky erased a 1.2-second deficit going into the final leg of the race, passing Australia's Melanie Schlanger with a 1:54.36 split over the final 200 meters. She also swam in the 100-meter freestyle heats.

On the third day of the meet, Ledecky set her fourth meet record in the 400-meter freestyle prelim heats with a time of 4:03.09. That night, Ledecky lowered the record again, setting the first world record ever at the new Gold Coast Aquatic Center with a time of 3:58.37. Ledecky's winning time was over six seconds quicker than American teammate and silver medalist Cierra Runge.

On the meet's final day, Ledecky set her fifth world record of the year, lowering her record in the 1500-meter freestyle by nearly six seconds with a time of 15:28.36. Ledecky swam the second half of the race faster than the first, completing the final 800 meters in 8:14.11—faster than any other woman has completed a regular 800-meter race in a textile suit. Ledecky lapped three competitors in the final and finished 27.33 seconds ahead of silver medalist Boyle. National Team Director Frank Busch described Ledecky's 1500 performance as "the most impressive race I have ever seen, and I've been in the sport for 50 years.... She's blazing a completely different trail than anyone who has come before."

During the championships' closing ceremonies, Ledecky was named the female swimmer of the meet.

At year's end, Ledecky was named the World Swimmer of the Year and American Swimmer of the Year by Swimming World Magazine.

2015

World Championships

At the 2015 World Aquatics Championships in Kazan, Russia, Ledecky won five gold medals and broke three world records. Her wins came in the 200-, 400-, 800-, and 1500-meter freestyles and the 4×200-meter freestyle. Her world records came in the 800- and 1500-meter freestyles. Ledecky is the first swimmer to win the 200-, 400-, 800- and 1500-meter freestyles in a major competition. Ledecky was also named the female swimmer of the meet.

Ledecky began the World Championships by winning gold in the 400-meter freestyle in a time of 3:59.13, a new championship record and almost four seconds ahead of her closest competitor.

In the heats of the 1500-meter freestyle on the second day of competition, Ledecky broke her own world record in a time of 15:27.71.

On the third day of competition during the morning session, Ledecky swam in the heats of the 200-meter freestyle and qualified first with a time of 1:55.82. In the evening session, Ledecky faced a tough double with the 1500-meter freestyle final and the semi-finals of the 200-meter freestyle shortly after. In the 1500-meter freestyle, Ledecky broke her own world record in a time of 15:25.48. Twenty-nine minutes later, Ledecky qualified 6th in the 200-meter freestyle with a time of 1:56.76.

In her only event on the fourth day of competition, the 200-meter freestyle, Ledecky won her third gold medal of the meet, winning in a time of 1:55.16. Unlike her other races, it was not an easy win for Ledecky, which featured the likes of Missy Franklin and Federica Pellegrini. In the end, Ledecky was able to hold off a fast charging Pellegrini, eventually winning by a 0.16 margin. Ledecky's final 50-meter split of 29.33 was the second-fastest in the field behind Pellegrini's 29.23.

On the fifth day of competition, Ledecky, with Missy Franklin, Leah Smith, and Katie McLaughlin won gold in the 4×200-meter freestyle relay. Swimming the anchor leg, Ledecky recorded a split of 1:55.64 and the Americans finished with an aggregate  time of 7:45.37.

On the seventh day of competition, Ledecky completed her World Championships run by winning gold in the 800-meter freestyle in a world record time of 8:07.39, breaking her own record by 3.61 seconds.

2016
Ledecky began 2016 at the Arena Pro Swim Series at Austin. On the final day of competition, she reset her world record in the 800-meter freestyle, clocking a time of 8:06.68. Earlier in the meet, she set world-leading times in the 200- and 400-meter freestyles and a U.S.-leading time in the 100-meter freestyle.

US Olympic Trials
At the 2016 United States Olympic Trials in Omaha, Nebraska, Ledecky won the 200-, 400- and 800-meter freestyles to qualify for her second Olympic team. Ledecky opened the Trials with a win and meet record in the 400-meter freestyle (3:58.98). Two days later, she recorded a time of 1:54.88 en route to winning the 200-meter freestyle. On July 1, Ledecky broke Janet Evans's 28-year-old national championship record in the morning preliminary heats of the 800-meter freestyle (8:10.91) before placing seventh that evening in the 100-meter freestyle (53.99). The next day, Ledecky lowered her meet record, winning the 800-meter freestyle final by nearly 10 seconds (8:10.32). With her pair of swims in the 800-meter freestyle, Ledecky took control of the top 11 fastest times in the event's history.  At the conclusion of the week, Ledecky was named the female swimmer of the meet.

Summer Olympic Games

Ledecky's first event in the 2016 Summer Olympics was the 4×100-meter freestyle relay, swimming the anchor leg for the United States in both the prelims and final. Ledecky recorded a split of 52.64 in the heats. In the final, she joined Simone Manuel, Abbey Weitzeil, and Dana Vollmer and recorded a split of 52.79, helping the team earn a silver medal (behind Australia) with a time of 3:31.89, a new national record for the United States.

Her first individual event was the 400-meter freestyle. Ledecky qualified in the heats with a time of 3:58.71, an Olympic record. In the final, she won the gold medal with a world record time of 3:56.46––nearly two seconds faster than her previous record from 2014 and almost 5 seconds ahead of the silver medalist, Jazmin Carlin.

Ledecky won a second gold in the 200-meter freestyle with a personal best of 1:53.73, beating Sarah Sjöström by 0.35 seconds.

Ledecky claimed her third gold in the 4×200-meter freestyle relay, with Allison Schmitt, Leah Smith, and Maya DiRado. Swimming the anchor leg again, Ledecky provided the fastest split of the field (1:53.74) to turn a 0.89-second deficit into a 1.84-second victory, stopping the clock at 7:43.03.

She won a fourth gold in her final individual event, the 800-meter freestyle.  She qualified in the heats with an Olympic record, 8:12.86, and set a world record in the finals of 8:04.79, over 11 seconds faster than the silver medalist, Jazmin Carlin.

With three individual titles, Ledecky became the first swimmer to win the 200, 400 and 800 m freestyle at the same Olympics since Debbie Meyer did so in 1968 in Mexico City. Ledecky's final medal total (four golds, one silver) is the most decorated single-Olympics performance by a U.S. female athlete in terms of gold medals, topping Missy Franklin (2012; four golds, 1 bronze), Simone Biles (2016; four golds, 1 bronze), and Amy Van Dyken (1996; four golds). Ledecky was also the 2nd most decorated Olympian at the 2016 games behind Michael Phelps (5 golds, 1 silver).

2017

NCAA Season
During the 2016–17 NCAA season, Ledecky set 12 NCAA records and nine American records while swimming as a freshman for Stanford University.

At the Ohio State Invitational in November 2016, Ledecky lowered her American and U.S. Open marks in the women's 500-yard freestyle and 1650-yard freestyle.

At the Pac-12 Championships in Federal Way, Washington, Ledecky earned Swimmer of the Meet honors with four American records as Stanford won its first conference title in four years. On the first day of the meet, Ledecky anchored the 800-yard freestyle relay with a 1:40.28 split to break the NCAA, American, and U.S. Open record in the 800-yard freestyle relay with Lia Neal, Katie Drabot, and Ella Eastin. The next day, Ledecky lowered her own mark again in the 500-yard freestyle with a time of 4:25.15. On the meet's third day, she won the 400-yard individual medley in a new American record of 3:57.68 before finishing second to teammate Simone Manuel in the 200-yard freestyle with a personal best time less than a half hour later. On the meet's final day, Ledecky joined Manuel, Neal, and Janet Hu to break the NCAA and American record in the 400-yard freestyle relay.

At the NCAA Championships in Indianapolis, Ledecky helped lead Stanford to its first team title since 1998. She reset her American, NCAA, and U.S. Open records in the 800-yard freestyle relay, 500-yard freestyle, and 400-yard freestyle relay and won a meet-best five race titles overall. On the meet's first day, she recorded the team's fastest split to lower the 800-yard freestyle relay record to 6:45.91 with Manuel, Neal, and Eastin. The next day, she lowered her own record in the 500-yard freestyle with a time of 4:24.06, beating the second-fastest performer of all-time, Leah Smith, by nearly five seconds. On the meet's third day, Ledecky's 20th birthday, Ledecky recorded a personal-best time of 1:40.36 in the 200-yard freestyle to edge Manuel and tie Louisville sophomore Mallory Comerford for the title. On the meet's final day, Ledecky set an NCAA record in the 1000-yard freestyle (9:06.90) en route to a championship record in the 1650-yard freestyle (15:07.70), defeating runner-up Smith by 21.19 seconds and lapping all other competitors. In the meet's final event, Ledecky joined Manuel, Neal, and Hu to swim the second leg of Stanford's 400-yard freestyle relay. The team lowered its previous record with a time of 3:07.61, securing a 526.5–366 decision over runner-up California-Berkeley, the largest championship margin of victory since 2003.

Following the season, Ledecky became the first freshman in 35 years to receive the Honda Cup, which recognizes the nation's top female collegiate athlete.

World Championships

At the 2017 US National Championships, the qualifying meet for the 2017 World Aquatics Championships, Ledecky won the 200-, 400-, and 800-meter freestyle and earned a spot on six events.

In Budapest, Ledecky broke the World Aquatics Championships' all-time female gold medal record, winning five golds and one silver to bring her career title total to 14.

In her first event, the 400-meter freestyle, Ledecky successfully defended her world title, finishing with a championship record time of 3:58.34. Later that evening, Ledecky swam the third leg of the 4×100-meter freestyle. Joined with Mallory Comerford, Kelsi Worrell, and Simone Manuel, Ledecky recorded a split of 53.83, helping the team win gold with a time of 3:31.72, a new national record for the United States.

On the third day of competition, Ledecky defended her 1500-meter freestyle title, winning with a time of 15:31.82. With this win being Ledecky's twelfth World Championship gold medal, Ledecky passed Missy Franklin for the most gold medals won by a female swimmer in long course World Championships history.

On the fourth day of competition, Ledecky tied for silver in the 200-meter freestyle (with Emma McKeon), finishing behind Federica Pellegrini with a time of 1:55.18. This was Ledecky's first international loss in a final in individual event. Notably, in the semifinals the day prior, Ledecky recorded the top time in the semifinals with a time of 1:54.69. She achieved this result less than an hour after swimming the 1500-meter freestyle final.

On the fifth day of competition, Ledecky, with Leah Smith, Mallory Comerford, and Melanie Margalis won gold in the 4×200-meter freestyle relay. Swimming the anchor leg, Ledecky recorded a split of 1:54.02, and the Americans finished with an aggregate time of 7:43.39.

Ledecky concluded the meet with a win in the 800-meter freestyle, her fifth-straight title in the event across Olympics and World Championships.

2018

NCAA Season
During the 2017–18 NCAA season, Ledecky set another three NCAA records and two American records while helping lead Stanford to its second straight team title.

At the Texas A&M Invitational in November 2017, Ledecky lowered her American and U.S. Open mark in the 1650-yard freestyle with a time of 15:03.31.

Following another undefeated dual meet season, Ledecky earned Swimmer of the Meet honors for the second straight year at the Pac-12 Championships in Federal Way, sweeping the 500-yard freestyle, 400-yard individual medley, and 200-yard freestyle. In the 400-yard individual medley, Ledecky broke Katinka Hosszú's all-time record by one-hundredth of a second, finishing in 3:56.53. Stanford earned its second team title in as many years.

At the NCAA Championships, Ledecky won the 500 and 1650-yard freestyle events by record margins and anchored the winning 800-yard freestyle relay team of Katie Drabot, Brooke Forde, and Ella Eastin. Ledecky finished second in the 400-yard individual medley to Eastin, who lowered the record Ledecky set a month earlier at the Pac-12 Championships. In the 1650-yard freestyle, Ledecky re-set her NCAA record in the 1000-yard free with a split of 9:05.89 en route to winning by more than 28 seconds. In the team standings, Stanford beat runner-up California-Berkeley by 220 points, the largest margin of victory in 25 years.

A week following Stanford's championship win, Ledecky announced at the National Press Club that she will forego her final two seasons of NCAA eligibility in order to accept professional endorsement and sponsorship opportunities. She signed with Wasserman sports agent Dan Levy for representation.

At the academic year's conclusion, the College Sports Information Directors of America named Ledecky the Division I Academic All-America Team Member of the Year for her athletic and academic achievements.

Professional career
Ledecky made her debut as a professional swimmer on May 16, 2018, at the TYR Pro Swim Series in Indianapolis, Indiana, where she beat her old world record in the 1500-meter freestyle, setting a new world record of 15:20.48. She broke the existing mark by five seconds.

Ledecky signed her first sponsorship deal with TYR Sport, Inc. on June 8, 2018.

In July 2018, at the US National Swimming Championships, Ledecky qualified for the 2018 Pan Pacific Championships by finishing first in the 200-, 400-, and 800-meter freestyle.

Pan Pacific Championships

At the 2018 Pan Pacific Championships in Tokyo, Ledecky led all swimmers with three individual titles, winning golds in the 400-, 800-, and 1500-meter freestyle. She also took bronze in the 200-meter freestyle and silver in the 4x200-meter freestyle.

On the first day of competition, Ledecky won gold in the 800-meter freestyle with a championship-record time of 8:09.13, topping runner-up Ariarne Titmus of Australia by 7.94 seconds. Just over an hour later, Ledecky took third in the 200-meter freestyle (1:55.15), finishing behind Canada's Taylor Ruck (1:54.44) and Japan's Rikako Ikee (1:54.85).

The next day, Ledecky anchored the United States team of Allison Schmitt, Leah Smith, and Katie McLaughlin in the 4x200-meter freestyle relay. Entering the water with a 2.88-second deficit, Ledecky swam the fourth-fastest relay split in history (1:53.84), nearly overtaking Australian Madeline Groves, who touched 0.25 seconds ahead of Ledecky to set a new championship and national record.

On the third day, Ledecky defeated Titmus wire-to-wire in the 400-meter freestyle.

Ledecky concluded the championships with another gold medal in the 1500-meter freestyle, winning by a margin of 21.11-seconds (15:38.97).

2019

World Championships

At the 2019 World Aquatics Championships in Gwangju, South Korea, Ledecky battled illness and withdrew from two events before winning her fourth-straight World Championship title in the 800-meter freestyle.

On the first day of competition, Ledecky led Australian Ariarne Titmus into the final wall of the 400-meter freestyle final before fading to second. The next morning, Ledecky struggled through her preliminary heat of the 1500-meter freestyle despite qualifying first for the event's final. She subsequently announced her withdrawal from the 1500 and 200-meter freestyle due to illness.

Ledecky returned to competition three days later to swim the final of the women's 4x200-meter freestyle relay. The Americans (Simone Manuel, Ledecky, Melanie Margalis and Katie McLaughlin) set a new American record and swam under the existing world record with a time of 7:41.87, yet placed second to the Australian team (7:41.50).

Still recovering from illness, Ledecky qualified second the next day for the final of the 800-meter freestyle. In the final, Ledecky swam to an early lead before Italian swimmer Simona Quadarella took over midway through the race. Ledecky trailed Quadarella into the final wall. Ledecky passed Quadarella and pulled away in the final 50 meters to win by 1.41 seconds.

In the inaugural season of the International Swimming League, Ledecky represented DC Trident.

For the seventh-straight year, Ledecky finished the year with the top times in the world in both the 800- and 1500-meter freestyle (8:10.70 and 15:35.98).

Ledecky collected several end-of-decade honors. Fifty-two percent of SwimSwam.com readers voted Ledecky the top swimmer of the decade, ahead of Michael Phelps. Readers of The London Evening Standard voted Ledecky the International Sportswoman of the Decade. She finished third in the Associated Press's Female Athlete of the Decade voting, behind Serena Williams and Simone Biles.

2020 
Ledecky began 2020 at the TYR Pro Swim Series in Des Moines, Iowa, where she won the 200-, 400- and 1500-meter freestyle races. Ledecky withdrew from the 800-meter freestyle race due to illness. Ledecky did not compete at any other events during 2020.

2021 
Ledecky began 2021 at the TYR Pro Swim Series at San Antonio, Texas. She won the 200-, 400-, 800- and 1500-meter freestyle races.

On Thursday May 20, 2021, at the Longhorn Aquatics Elite Invite Ledecky won the long course 100 meter freestyle final by one one-hundredth of a second in a time of 53.82 with second place going to Simone Manuel.

US Olympic Trials
As part of the NBC evening telecast for day one of the 2020 USA Swimming Olympic Trials (postponed to June 2021 due to the COVID-19 pandemic), Ledecky was featured in an interview discussing Stanford University's commencement, finishing her college degree, and training for the Olympic Trials. Because training facilities were closed during the pandemic, Ledecky and her colleague Simone Manuel trained for the Olympics in a 25-yard private pool in Atherton, in the backyard of masters swimmer Tod Spieker.

On the second day, June 14, 2021, Ledecky competed in the prelims of the 400 meter freestyle in the morning, swimming a 4:03.07, ranking 1st out of all prelims heats, and advancing to the final in the evening. The 400 meter freestyle was the first race on Ledecky's schedule where she had the opportunity to make the 2020 USA Olympic Team. In the evening final of the 400 meter freestyle, Ledecky finished first with a time of 4:01.27, securing her first spot on her third US Olympic Team swimming the 400 meter freestyle at the 2020 Summer Olympics. This accomplishment was highlighted by various news outlets including NBC Sports, Newsweek, and USA Today.

In the morning of day three, Ledecky swam a 1:57.58 in the 200 meter freestyle prelims, ranking second fastest of all heats. Two events later, she swam a 15:43.10 in the 1500 meter freestyle prelims, ranking as the fastest swimmer of prelims heat, advancing to the final, and setting a new Championship Record over four seconds faster than the previous record she set in 2013. Later the same day in the evening semifinals for the 200 meter freestyle, Ledecky finished first with a time of 1:55.83.

On day 4, June 16, she won both the 200m and 1500m freestyle finals in the evening. Ledecky swam a 15:40.50 in the 1500 meter freestyle, lowering her Championship Record from the day before and becoming the first winner of the women's 1500 meter freestyle at the US Olympic Trials. She swam a 1:55.11 in the 200 meter freestyle. These two swims secured her spots on the US Olympic Team for the 2020 Summer Olympics in the 1500 meter freestyle and 200 meter freestyle individual events as well as the 4x200 meter freestyle relay. Ledecky won the 200 meter and 1500 meter freestyle finals in a time span of about 70 minutes as well as collecting her medal at the 200 meter freestyle medal ceremony and eating a snack.

Friday June 18, 2021, the sixth day of competition, Ledecky won with a time of 8:16.61 in the prelims heats of the 800-meter freestyle and advanced to the final. The following day in the final, Ledecky won with a time of 8:14.62 and qualified to swim the 800 meter freestyle at the 2020 Summer Olympics for the United States.

Summer Olympic Games

At the 2020 Summer Olympics in Tokyo, Japan, Ledecky won two gold medals and two silver medals, making her the most decorated U.S. female athlete for a second straight Summer Olympics. Ledecky began her racing in the prelims of the 400 meter freestyle, ranking first overall with her time of 4:00.45 and advancing to the final. However, she finished second to Australian swimmer Ariarne Titmus to win the silver medal, trailing Titmus by half a second after leading at the 300m mark. Ledecky's time of 3:57.36 was the second-fastest time of her career and fourth-fastest in history. This was Ledecky's first loss in an individual event at the Olympics.

In the debut of the women's 1500 meter freestyle at the Summer Olympics, Ledecky set an Olympic record in her heat with a time of 15:35.35 and advanced to the final ranked first overall. In the same prelims session as the 1500 meter freestyle, Ledecky ranked first in the 200 meter freestyle with a time of 1:55.28 and advanced to the event's semifinals. She swam a 1:55.34 in the semifinals of the 200 meter freestyle and advanced to the final ranking third overall. In the finals of these two events, Ledecky failed to reach the podium for the 200 m freestyle, placing 5th behind Titmus, Haughey, Oleksiak, and Yang, but placed 1st in the 1500 m race, leading teammate Erica Sullivan (silver) by 4 seconds, clinching her first gold medal of the Games. She finished the final in 15:37.34, but her record from the prelim round still holds.

The next day, Ledecky anchored for Team USA in the women's 4x200 freestyle relay, winning a silver medal alongside teammates Allison Schmitt, Paige Madden, and Katie McLaughlin behind China. Before she entered the pool, the United States was trailing both Australia and China, but she swam a time of 1:53.76 to finish the race 0.4 seconds behind the Chinese swimmer Li Bingjie and ahead of Australia, who were the favorites coming into the competition. Ledecky's split was the fastest of all swimmers in the relay finals. Ledecky won her second gold medal of the Olympics and her seventh of all time in the 800-meter freestyle. Her six individual gold medals are the most of any female Olympic swimmer and female US Olympian, and the second-most of all Olympic swimmers behind Michael Phelps. She became the first swimmer to win a distance event three times in a row, as well as the youngest and oldest person to win the 800 free (at age 15 in 2012 and age 24 in 2021).

Following the Olympic Games on September 22nd, Ledecky announced her intention to train with coach Anthony Nesty at the University of Florida. Additionally, Ledecky signed on to be a volunteer swim coach for the Florida Gators.

2022

World Championships

At the 2022 World Aquatics Championships in Budapest, Ledecky won all four of her events: the 400 meter freestyle, 1500 meter freestyle, 4x200 freestyle relay, and 800-meter freestyle. With four golds, Ledecky expanded her career World Championships medal haul to 22, passing Natalie Coughlin for most for a female swimmer. Ledecky earned FINA's female swimmer of the meet trophy for a third time.    

On the first day of competition, Ledecky won the 400-meter freestyle in a championship record 3:58.15, besting Canadian silver medalist Summer McIntosh by 1.24 seconds. Ledecky's swim was the seventh-fastest performance in history.    

Ledecky won the 1500-meter freestyle two days later in a time of 15:30.15, over 14 seconds faster than runner-up and teammate Katie Grimes. Ledecky's time was the sixth-fastest ever (behind only her own performances) and over 7 seconds faster than her winning time at the Tokyo 2020 Olympics.   

Ledecky joined Claire Weinstein, Leah Smith, and Bella Sims on the U.S. 4x200 freestyle relay on day five. Swimming the third leg, Ledecky passed Australia and Canada to take the lead with the third-fastest split in history (1:53.67). Sims anchored the team to a championship record time of 7:41.45.   

On day 7, Ledecky won her final event by over 10 seconds, recording a time of 8:08.04 in the 800-meter freestyle. The swim was the fifth-fastest in history  and earned Ledecky the 28 fastest times in the distance. With the victory, Ledecky became the first swimmer, male or female, to win five consecutive world championship titles in an individual event.

FINA Swimming World Cup 
On October 28, during the Toronto round of the FINA Swimming World Cup, Ledecky swam the 1500m short course event for the first time. She set a time of 15:08.24, breaking the previous world record set by German swimmer Sarah Köhler by almost 10 seconds.

The following week at the World Cup's Indianapolis stop, Ledecky broke the world record in the 800m short course freestyle. Her time of 7:57.42 surpassed Mireia Belmonte's mark from 2013.

Honors and awards
Ledecky was a USA Olympic team member in 2012, 2016, and 2020, and holds the female record for most individual gold medals (14) and overall gold medals (19) at the World Aquatics Championships.

Her combined 20 individual titles at the Olympics (6) and World Aquatics Championships (14) is also a record for female swimmers.

Ledecky has also received the following awards:
 Swimming World World Swimmer of the Year Award: 2013, 2014, 2015, 2016, 2018
 Swimming World American Swimmer of the Year Award: 2013, 2014, 2015, 2016, 2017, 2018, 2021, 2022
 SwimSwam Top 100 (Women's): 2021 (#1), 2022 (#1)
 FINA Swimmer of the Year: 2013
 FINA Best Swimming Performance of the Year: 2015, 2016
 Associated Press Female Athlete of the Year: 2017, 2022
 L'Équipe Champion of Champions: 2014, 2017
 Time 100: 2016 (youngest person on the list)
 USOC SportsWoman of the Year: 2012–13, 2016, 2017
 USA Swimming Athlete of the Year: 2013, 2014, 2015, 2016, 2018
 USA Swimming Performance of the Year Award: 2012, 2013, 2014, 2015, 2016
 Golden Goggle Female Athlete of the Year: 2013, 2014, 2015, 2016, 2017, 2018, 2021, 2022
 Golden Goggle Female Race of the Year: 2012, 2013, 2014, 2015, 2022
 Golden Goggle Breakout Performer of the Year: 2012
 Honda Sports Award Winner for NCAA Division I Swimming and Diving: 2016–17
 Honda Cup Winner: 2016–17
 Women's Sports Foundation Athlete of the Year (Individual Sport): 2017
 Academic All-America Team Member of the Year, Division I: 2017–2018
 Best Female Athlete ESPY Award at the 2022 ESPY Awards
 Best Female Olympian ESPY Award at the 2022 ESPY Awards

Personal bests

World records

See also

 List of Olympic medalists in swimming (women)
 List of multiple Olympic gold medalists
 List of select Jewish swimmers
 List of top Olympic gold medalists in swimming
 List of World Aquatics Championships medalists in swimming (women)
 List of individual gold medalists in swimming at the Olympics and World Aquatics Championships (women)
 List of world records in swimming
 World record progression 400 metres freestyle
 World record progression 800 metres freestyle
 World record progression 1500 metres freestyle
 List of USOC Athlete of the Year award winners
 List of Associated Press Athletes of the Year

References

External links

 
 
 
 
 
 

1997 births
Living people
American female freestyle swimmers
American people of Czech descent
American people of Jewish descent
American people of Irish descent
Catholics from Maryland
Medalists at the 2012 Summer Olympics
Medalists at the 2016 Summer Olympics
Medalists at the 2020 Summer Olympics
Olympic gold medalists for the United States in swimming
Olympic silver medalists for the United States in swimming
People from Bethesda, Maryland
Schools of the Sacred Heart alumni
Swimmers from Washington, D.C.
Stanford Cardinal women's swimmers
Swimmers at the 2012 Summer Olympics
Swimmers at the 2016 Summer Olympics
Swimmers at the 2020 Summer Olympics
World Aquatics Championships medalists in swimming
World record holders in swimming
Swimmers from Maryland
American Roman Catholics